Les Pétroliers du Nord is a professional iice hockey team based in Laval, Quebec, Canada. The team is part of the Ligue Nord-Américaine de Hockey (LNAH), and plays at the Colisée de Laval.

History
The team was founded in 2018 as Berlin BlackJacks in Berlin, New Hampshire, but after only 12 games and a 3–8–1 record, it was replaced by the Pétroliers du Nord, owned by the Pétrole & Propane Bélanger company.  After finishing the season in Saint-Jérôme, the Pétroliers moved to Laval for 2019–20.

References

External links
 Les Pétroliers du Nord official site

Ligue Nord-Américaine de Hockey teams
Sport in Laval, Quebec